Ralf Dusend (born 28 September 1959) is a retired German football player.

Honours
 UEFA Cup Winners' Cup finalist: 1978–79
 DFB-Pokal winner: 1978–79, 1979–80
 DFB-Pokal finalist: 1977–78

References

1959 births
Living people
German footballers
Germany under-21 international footballers
Fortuna Düsseldorf players
1. FC Nürnberg players
Bundesliga players
Association football midfielders
Sportspeople from Neuss
Footballers from North Rhine-Westphalia
20th-century German people